Gerontia pantherina is a species of small air-breathing land snails, terrestrial gastropod mollusks in the family Charopidae.

References

Charopidae
Gastropods described in 1882